Patrick Siefkes (born 12 January 1990) is a German footballer who plays as a goalkeeper for Regionalliga Nord club SV Drochtersen/Assel. He is related to Christoph Siefkes.

External links
 

1990 births
Living people
21st-century German people
People from Dessau-Roßlau
Footballers from Saxony-Anhalt
German footballers
Association football goalkeepers
Oberliga (football) players
3. Liga players
Regionalliga players
Hallescher FC players
1. FC Magdeburg players
FC Carl Zeiss Jena players
FSV Wacker 90 Nordhausen players
SV Drochtersen/Assel players